Walter Norman Powys (28 July 1849 – 7 January 1892) was an English first-class cricketer. Powys was a left-handed batsman who bowled left-arm roundarm fast.

Powys was the son of the Hon. Atherton Legh Powys and Charlotte Elizabeth Norman. He was admitted to Pembroke College, Cambridge in 1870, and re-admitted after interruptions in 1874 and 1877, finally graduating in 1879. He played first-class cricket for Cambridge University, Hampshire and the Marylebone Cricket Club from 1871 to 1879, playing 27 first-class matches, with his final first-class match in 1879 coming for the Marylebone Cricket Club against Oxford University. In addition Powys played first-class matches during that period for the Gentlemen of the North, the Gentlemen in the Gentlemen v Players fixture, the Gentlemen of Marylebone Cricket Club and the Orleans Club.

In his first-class career, Powys scored 244 runs at a batting average of 6.97, with a high score of 30. With the ball Powys took 98 wickets at a bowling average of 14.44, taking six five-wicket hauls and three ten-wicket hauls in a match and with best figures of 9/42 in 1871 in his debut first-class match against the Marylebone Cricket Club. In the field Powys took nine catches.

Powys died at Nottingham, Nottinghamshire on 7 January 1892.

Family
Powys' brothers Arthur and Richard both played first-class cricket, as did his uncle Arthur Crichton.

References

External links
Walter Powys at Cricinfo
Walter Powys at CricketArchive
Matches and detailed statistics for Walter Powys

1849 births
1892 deaths
People from North Northamptonshire
English cricketers
Cambridge University cricketers
North v South cricketers
Gentlemen cricketers
Hampshire cricketers
Marylebone Cricket Club cricketers
English cricket coaches
Orleans Club cricketers
Gentlemen of the North cricketers
Alumni of Pembroke College, Cambridge
Gentlemen of Marylebone Cricket Club cricketers